Marshall Hotel, also known as the Dunn Hotel, is a historic American hotel building located at Sikeston, Scott County, Missouri. It was built in 1910, and is a three-story, red brick commercial building with a shed roof.  It measures 70 feet by 120 feet and features a cast iron storefront and segmental arched windows.

It was added to the National Register of Historic Places in 1984.

References

Hotel buildings on the National Register of Historic Places in Missouri
Hotel buildings completed in 1910
Buildings and structures in Scott County, Missouri
National Register of Historic Places in Scott County, Missouri